The Oracle Challenger Series – New Haven was a professional tennis tournament played on hard courts. It was part of the ATP Challenger Tour and the Women's Tennis Association (WTA) 125K series. It was held in New Haven, Connecticut, United States in 2019.

Past finals

Men's singles

Women's singles

Men's doubles

Women's doubles

References

External links
 ATP web site

 
ATP Challenger Tour
WTA 125 tournaments
Hard court tennis tournaments in the United States
Tennis in Connecticut
2019 establishments in Connecticut
Recurring sporting events established in 2019
Sports in New Haven, Connecticut